Sharry Konopski (December 2, 1967August 25, 2017) was an American model and actress. She was chosen as Playboy's Playmate of the Month in August 1987 and appeared in numerous Playboy videos. She posed nude again for Playboy in the March 1997 issue.

Personal life
On April 1, 1995, as she was driving home from work, three deer ran into the road, and she rolled her Mustang. Her spinal injuries left her paralyzed from the waist down.

She appeared on The Sally Jesse Raphael Show to discuss her injuries.

She died of pneumonia on August 25, 2017, and was survived by her second husband Joseph Randall, her ex-husband Mark DeBolt, and two children from her first marriage.

See also
List of people in Playboy 1980–1989

References

External links

1967 births
1980s Playboy Playmates
2017 deaths
21st-century American women
Actresses from Washington (state)
American film actresses
American people with disabilities
Deaths from pneumonia in the United States
Models with disabilities
People from Longview, Washington
People with paraplegia